The Littoral Banovina or Littoral Banate (/ Primorska banovina), was a province (banovina) of the Kingdom of Yugoslavia between 1929 and 1939. This province consisted of much of the Croatian region of Dalmatia and parts of present-day Bosnia and Herzegovina and was named for its coastal (maritime) location. The capital city of the Littoral Banovina was Split.

Borders
According to the 1931 Constitution of the Kingdom of Yugoslavia, 
The Littoral Banovina is bounded on the north by the southern boundaries already drawn of the Sava and Vrbas Banovinas as far as the intersection of the limits of the three districts of Jajce, Bugojno, and Travnik (Rakovce, hill 1217). From this point the boundary of the Banovina follows the eastern border of the district of Bugojno, then the northern boundary of the district of Konjic, to continue along the eastern boundary of the districts of Konjic and Mostar up to the intersection of the boundaries of the districts of Mostar, Stolac, and Nevesinje. It then continues along the eastern boundary of the district of Stolac, which it includes. On the Adriatic, the boundary of the Banovina passes through the Neretva and Pelješac channels to join the maritime frontier of the State.

History
In 1939, the Littoral Banovina was merged with the Sava Banovina and parts of neighboring provinces to create the Banovina of Croatia.

In 1941, the World War II Axis Powers occupied the former area of the Littoral Banovina. Coastal areas from Split to Zadar were annexed by Fascist Italy with the remainder becoming a part of the Independent State of Croatia. Following World War II, the region was divided between Croatia and Bosnia and Herzegovina within a federal Communist Yugoslavia.

Bans
Ivo Tartaglia (1929–1932)
Josip Jablanović (1932–1935)
Mirko Buić (1935–1939)

References
The Constitution of the Kingdom of Yugoslavia

Yugoslav Croatia
Geographic history of Bosnia and Herzegovina
Banovinas of the Kingdom of Yugoslavia
1929 establishments in Yugoslavia
1939 disestablishments in Yugoslavia
Former subdivisions of Bosnia and Herzegovina